Hexastylis finzelii, or Finzel's wild ginger, is species of plant in the Aristolochiaceae native to northern Alabama. It is known from two populations in Marshall County. There are thought to only be around 1,000 individuals in the wild.

The plant is named after Brian Finzel, a photographer who discovered the species in 2019. It was formally described by botanist Brian Keener in 2020.

Description
Hexastylis finzelii is visually similar to H. speciosa and H. arifolia, with the shape of the flowers being the only defining feature. The flowers are difficult to see as they bloom beneath the leaf litter, which is thought to explain why the species went undiscovered for so long. It is hypothesized that they are pollinated by beetles.

Distribution and habitat
The species is only known to persist on Bishop Mountain in Alabama. It is found growing out of leaf litter in moist, hardwood forests. Soils are rocky and well-draining.

The populations are protected as they exist on federal Tennessee Valley Authority lands.

References 

Aristolochiaceae
Plants described in 2020